Hawangen is a municipality in the district of Unterallgäu in Bavaria, Germany, with about 1,254 inhabitants. The town has a municipal association with Ottobeuren.

References

Unterallgäu